Amblytenes is a genus of moth in the family Cosmopterigidae. It contains only one species, Amblytenes lunatica, which is found in Brazil.

References

External links

Natural History Museum Lepidoptera genus database

Cosmopterigidae
Monotypic moth genera
Moths of South America